Karl Torsten Henric "Tosse" Hedlund (born 7 April 1945) is a retired Swedish professional ice hockey player. He played for Skellefteå AIK and Västra Frölunda IF. He also competed in the 1968 Winter Olympics, where he scored three goals and two assists.

Career statistics

References

External links

1945 births
Frölunda HC players
Living people
People from Skellefteå Municipality
Skellefteå AIK players
Swedish ice hockey defencemen
Olympic ice hockey players of Sweden
Ice hockey players at the 1968 Winter Olympics
Sportspeople from Västerbotten County